"Doomed" is a song by American singer-songwriter Moses Sumney. It was released on June 27, 2017, as the lead single from his debut studio album Aromanticism through Jagjaguwar. It is the ninth track on the album.

The song was written and produced by Sumney alongside Matthew Otto, a former member of the Canadian music group Majical Cloudz.

Background and composition
In an interview with Jon Pareles of The New York Times, Sumney called "Doomed" the "thesis" of Aromanticism in explaining why he chose the song as the album's lead single.

"Doomed" is an existential reflection on mortality and love in relation to a lack of love, or aromanticism. In the chorus, Sumney ask himself: "Am I vital / If my heart is idle? / Am I doomed?" With the lyrics "If lovelessness is godlessness / Will you cast me to the wayside?", Jason King of Pitchfork described it as "foreclosing the possibility of finding lasting intimacy and love with a partner."

The track is musically minimalist, prominently featuring Sumney's "nearly-a cappella" falsetto vocals which are backed by sustained synthesizer chords. Brian Josephs of Spin wrote, "Sumney is luminous here within the percussion-less drones' warmth—his falsetto angelic, his sentiments human." Cyclone Wehner of Music Feeds called it an "existentialist operatic dirge."

Critical reception
The track was met with favorable reviews. It was awarded "Best New Track" distinction by Pitchfork upon its release, with Briana Younger praising the "rawness" of Sumney's vocals as "arresting" and saying "the best qualities of his music are put into overdrive." Jon Pareles of The New York Times praised Sumney's "unearthly falsetto". Brian Josephs of Spin called the song "the album's stunner."

Year-end lists
"Doomed" was listed at #36 by Pitchfork on its "The 100 Best Songs of 2017" list. The song was included at #35 on Spins "The 101 Best Songs of 2017" list.

Music video
The accompanying music video of "Doomed" was released the same day as the track. Directed by Allie Avital, the video features Sumney floating naked in a tank of water. Near the video's end, a woman is seen separated across from Sumney in her own tank as they stare at one another. The visual pans outward from Sumney to reveal a field of tanks with naked individuals floating within each one. The visual has been compared to the pods of The Matrix films. The music video was listed at #2 on "The 5 Best Videos Of The Week" list by Stereogum, who called it "a tragically resonant visual metaphor about black American isolation."

The music video was nominated for the Independent Video of the Year award at the 2018 AIM Independent Music Awards.

Performances
Sumney performed the song at St Stephen's Uniting Church in Sydney, Australia. A video of the performance was released on Sumney's YouTube channel on July 10, 2017, the same day his debut album Aromanticism was announced.

Personnel
Credits adapted from the liner notes of Aromanticism.

 Moses Sumney – vocals, songwriting, production
 Matthew Otto – songwriting, synthesizer
 Joshua Willing Halpern – engineering
 Ben Baptie – mixing
 Ted Jensen – mastering

In popular culture
"Doomed" appeared in the ninth episode of the third season The Path, titled "The Veil" which aired on Hulu on February 28, 2018.

It also appeared in the Season 6 finale of Netflix's Orange Is the New Black.<ref>{{Cite web |title=Orange Is The New Black'''s choices remain suspect, but a strong finale means the show gets away with it—for now |url=https://tv.avclub.com/orange-is-the-new-blacks-choices-remain-suspect-but-a-1827920834 |last=McNutt |first=Myles |date=July 27, 2018 |website=The A.V. Club |accessdate=May 28, 2020}}</ref>

"Doomed" was included in the soundtrack to Melina Matsoukas' 2019 film Queen & Slim.

The song was also featured in the end credits of "The Absence of Field", the third episode of the third season of the HBO science fiction dystopian thriller television series Westworld''. An instrumental cover of "Doomed" by composer Ramin Djawadi is also played in the final scene of the episode. The episode aired on March 29, 2020.

It was also featured in Grey's Anatomy in the 22nd episode of the 14th season, titled, "Fight For Your Mind".

References

2017 singles
2017 songs
Jagjaguwar singles
Moses Sumney songs
Songs written by Moses Sumney